Danmark/Denmark is the fourth studio album from the Danish rock band Nephew. The first single release from the album was 007 Is Also Gonna Die.

The album was released on 5 June 2009, the Danish constitution day or "Grundlovsdag". The physical album (available in both CD and LP-format) includes a DVD entitled VideoVideo, containing 12 artist's interpretations of the 12 tracks from the album's track listing.

Track listing

Publicity
"007 Is Also Gonna Die", was chosen by the Danish radio channel P3 to be The voice Uundgåelige (P3's Unavoidable) in week 16, 2009, meaning that the song will be played at least once every two hours for an entire week.

References

2009 albums
Nephew (band) albums